St. Martin High School is a suburban public high school located in the unincorporated community of St. Martin, Mississippi, United States, with an Ocean Springs postal address. It is part of the Jackson County School District.

Athletics
St. Martin High School's mascot is the Yellowjacket. Its athletics department consists of Football, Track, Swimming, Cross Country, Softball, Soccer, Volleyball, Basketball, Tennis, Archery, Bowling, and Baseball.

Extracurricular activities
St. Martin High School hosts various activities for its students to take part in. The programs listed below include, but are not limited to, the activities in which students may take part.
FBLA
National Honor Society
FCCLA

St. Martin High School is also home to a branch of the Air Force Junior Reserve Officers' Training Corps, a program shared with Vancleave High School that is hosted at St. Martin.

Faculty
The St. Martin High School faculty consists of the administration, counselors, support staff, and teachers. The principal is Dina Holland.

References

External links
 
 Jackson County School District

Public high schools in Mississippi
Schools in Jackson County, Mississippi
Public middle schools in Mississippi